Fabrizio Bontempi (born 1 November 1966) is an Italian cyclist. He competed in the road race at the 1988 Summer Olympics.

References

External links
 

1966 births
Living people
Italian male cyclists
Olympic cyclists of Italy
Cyclists at the 1988 Summer Olympics
Cyclists from Brescia